Sarola is a village located in Salhawas Block of Jhajjar district in Haryana. Sarpanch of Sarola is Bhupendra.

Chandigarh is the state capital for Sarola village. It is located around 255.0 kilometers away from Sarola.
The surrounding nearby villages and its distance from Sarola are Khudan 1.8 km, Chhapar 2.1 km, Subana 2.8 km, Ahari 3.7 km, Babepur 4.2 km, Dhakla 4.2 km, Kasni 4.7 km.

Demographics
In 2011, the population was 1407. The native language of Sarola is Hindi. Sarola people use Hindi, Haryanvi language for communication.

Caste wise male female population 2011

Religion
Majority of the residents are Hindu, with Ahir being the dominant social group. A famous Mata Mandir is situated in this village.

Gram Panchayat of Sarola Village

See also 
 Khudan
 Chhapar, Jhajjar
 Dhakla, Jhajjar

References 

Villages in Jhajjar district